The 2015 Spike For Peace International Beach Volleyball Tournament was an international women's beach volleyball tournament hosted in Pasig, Metro Manila, Philippines from November 29 to December 3, 2015.

The tournament staged by the Philippine Sports Commission thru its beach volleyball consultant Eric Lecain and backed by the FIVB, AVC, POC and the local volleyball federation, the Larong Volleyball sa Pilipinas, Inc. (LVPI) was staged indoors at the PhilSports Arena.  of sand from the Southwoods Golf Course was used for a beach volleyball court which was installed on top of the wooden floor of arena.

The opening ceremonies held last November 30 was well attended by PSC Chairman Richie Garcia, POC board members Cynthia Carrion and Julian Camacho, LVPI Vice President Peter Cayco and LVPI board members Jeff Tamayo, Ricky Palou and Tatz Suzara.

Participants
14 regular teams (some of them are also playing in the 2016 Rio Olympic qualifiers) participated in the tournament. Canada, China, Poland and Switzerland were also invited but didn't confirm its participation. For the Philippine delegation, Lecain also considered to add the services of Alyssa Valdez and Jovelyn Gonzaga in one of the national teams but was not able to confirmed participation from the two.

Both Philippine teams were coached by Oliver Almadro.

Officials 

Aside from this, the LVPI helped in the technical aspects of the tournament, including the officiating and the equipment. The organizers paid the sanction fee from the FIVB for the exhibition tournament.

Preliminary round
The 14 teams were divided into 4 pools (3 teams, 3 teams, 4 teams and 4 teams).

Pool A

|}

|}

Pool B

|}

|}

Pool C

|}

|}

Pool D

|}

|}

Schedule: Philippine Sports Commission

Second round

Contenders bracket

|}

Final round

Quarterfinals
The pairings of the quarter finals were determined through the drawing of lots. Each tie consist of one team which topped the pool in the preliminary round and a winner from the contenders bracket.

|}

5th–8th place semifinals

|}

Semifinals

|}

Seventh place match

|}

Fifth place match

|}

Third place match

|}

Final

|}

Final standing

References

Spike for Peace
Spike for Peace
Spike for Peace, 2015
Beach volleyball competitions in the Philippines